Lilla Hoparegränd is an alley in Gamla stan, the old town of Stockholm, Sweden.  Passing between Skeppsbron and Österlånggatan it forms a parallel street to Ferkens Gränd, Gaffelgränd, Pelikansgränd and Johannesgränd.

The street appears in historical records as Wargzfrenden in 1550, Warge Grenden in 1646, Vargsgränden during the 16th-17th centuries and finally as Lilla Hopare gr. in 1771.  Why the alley was originally called Varggränd ("Wolf Alley") is not known, however, Varg is still a common proper name in Sweden and might refer to an individual associated with the alley. The present name refers to a Michel Hoper or Hopare.  Hoper is of Dutch or Frisian origin and means hooper (e.g. maker of barrels).

See also 
 List of streets and squares in Gamla stan
 Stora Hoparegränd
 Pelikansgränd
 Gaffelgränd

References

External links 
hitta.se - Location map and virtual walk

Streets in Stockholm